Black Sparrow Press is a New England based independent book publisher, known for literary fiction and poetry.

History
Black Sparrow was founded in Los Angeles, California, in 1966 by John Martin in order to publish the works of Charles Bukowski and other avant-garde authors. Barbara Martin co-founded the press with her husband and, as the press's lead designer, she was responsible for its distinctive and bold covers. After 35 years, and 700 titles, John Martin sold the company in 2002.

In 2020, John Martin agreed that editor Joshua Bodwell at Godine would be his successor to continue Black Sparrow's publishing legacy. In early 2020, the press released Wicked Enchantment: Selected Poems, the first new edition of work by Wanda Coleman since the author's passing in 2013; the collection is edited and introduced by Terrance Hayes. Coleman is a long-time Black Sparrow author and one of its most important poets.

In March 2020, as part of a relaunch of its parent company, Black Sparrow joined Two Rivers Distribution, an Ingram brand, for sales of its titles to readers worldwide.

Praise for recent titles
Wicked Enchantment: Selected Poems by Wanda Coleman, edited by Terrance Hayes

One of the year's best!
—New York Times and Washington Post 

geode by Susan Barba

"geode is rich with shining interiors and tactile relationships, delicate human to delicate earth, small delusions of ownership against wider backdrops of loss and time. Poems acting as guides, helping us navigate and remember, create an intricate overlay of worlds, humans and trees."
—Naomi Shihab Nye, New York Times Magazine 

Cuttings from the Tangle by Richard Buckner

"During a career spent crisscrossing the country, Buckner has seen plenty. In all those hotels between here and there, at those bars and truck stops and lounges, he would sit and listen . . . Buckner puts that power of observation to good use."
—NPR's Morning Edition 

"This book confirms a truth hinted at all these years in the language of his lyrics: Buckner is a writer."
—Literary Hub 

Bukowski, A Life by Neeli Cherkovski

"A serious appraisal . . . a treasure trove for Bukowski fans....Cherkovski's access to his subject allows him an intimacy otherwise impossible as he guides us through the poet-author's miserable childhood; his early drinking; his years as a serf in the post office; the poetry readings that became circuses..."
—John Rechy, Los Angeles Times 

American Wake: Poems by Kerrin McCadden

"McCadden's sparse yet vibrant poetry spans those two geographies she finds home in, New England and Ireland. The vastness of loss, grief and family parallel only mountainous terrains and the waving sea."
—Vermont Public Radio 

Summer Solstice: An Essay by Nina MacLaughlin

"A brief reverie, short and sweet like the fleeting days it describes."
—Green Mountain Review 

Short Dog: Cab Driver Stories from the L.A. Streets by Dan Fante

"With the rerelease of Short Dog, we find Fante at his most grizzled and unrepentant... like Jim Thompson whispering lines for Charles Bukowski to carnival bark."
—Los Angeles Review of Books 

"Shaggy, gritty...echoes of Burroughs and Kerouac...Fante's raunchy, dynamic voice occasionally soars."
—Publishers Weekly

Notable awards and honors
Eddie Chuculate, PEN/O. Henry Prize 2007.

Wanda Coleman, Lenore Marshall Poetry Prize 1999, National Book Award Poetry Finalist 2001.

Naomi Replansky, William Carlos Williams Award 2013, Poetry Society of America

References

External links 
 
Black Sparrow Press Collection, University of Arizona Libraries Special Collections
Modern American Poetry Collection - Ball State University Archives and Special Collections Research Center
Black Sparrow Press Collection at the Stuart A. Rose Manuscript, Archives, and Rare Book Library
Black Sparrow Press Archive at Bruce Peel Special Collection, University of Alberta

Publishing companies established in 1966
Book publishing companies based in Massachusetts
Companies based in Boston
1966 establishments in California